Brookline Village is a commercial district in Brookline, Massachusetts.

Brookline Village may also refer to:

 Brookline Village (MBTA station), an MBTA station serving the district
 Brookline, Missouri, a former village